Price adjustment may refer to:

 Quantity adjustment, a concept in economics related to changes in price and quantity
 Price adjustment (retail), a retail policy also called price protection
 Pricing, the process of determining what a company will receive in exchange for its product or service
 Purchase price adjustment, the change in value of an asset between negotiation and closing